Mathilde Géron (born 24 March 1986 in Sainte-Adresse) is a French sailor. She competed in the 470 class at the 2012 Summer Olympics.

Géron partook in the Tour Voile sailing race in July 2019, where she finished 12th as skipper of the all women's team La Boulangère.

References

External links 
 
 
 
 
 

1986 births
Living people
French female sailors (sport)
Olympic sailors of France
Sailors at the 2012 Summer Olympics – 470
People from Sainte-Adresse
Mediterranean Games gold medalists for France
Competitors at the 2013 Mediterranean Games
Sportspeople from Seine-Maritime
Mediterranean Games medalists in sailing
21st-century French women